Party of Freedom and Solidarity is a political party in Mozambique. In the 2004 legislative election, the party received 20,686 votes (0.88%) nationally which did not qualify them for a seat in the Assembly of the Republic of Mozambique. In the 2009 legislative election, the party received 0.90% of all votes and did not qualify for a seat.

References

Political parties in Mozambique